Zhao Wenqi (born 14 September 1987), also known as Vanessa Zhao, is a Chinese actress and model.

Zhao is noted for playing Qin Yumo in the romantic comedy television series iPartment, which enjoyed the highest ratings in China when it was broadcast.

Early life
Zhao was born in Changchun, Jilin on September 14, 1987. She graduated from Beijing Film Academy, majoring in acting.

Acting career
Zhao had her first experience in front of the camera in 2004, and she was chosen to act as a support actor in The Magic Touch of Fate, a television series starring Ruby Lin and Alec Su.

After playing minor roles in various films and television series, such as Sounds of the Old City, Love in the War, Beautiful Bar, The Song of Yimeng, Happy Star, The Chinese Connection, Kou Lan Slam, Zhao received her first leading role in the second season of romantic comedy television series iPartment, alongside Eric Wang, Deng Jiajia, Michael Chen, Loura Lou, Kimi Li, Jean Lee and Sean Sun, the series was one of the most watched ones in mainland China in that year. Zhao also filmed in a number of successful sequels to iPartment.

In 2011, played the role of Scorpion Demon in Journey to the West, a myth drama starring Nie Yuan, Wu Yue, Zang Jinsheng and Elvis Tsui, which adapted from Wu Cheng'en's classical novel of the same title.

Filmography

Film

Television

References

External links

1987 births
Beijing Film Academy alumni
Actresses from Changchun
Living people
Chinese film actresses
Chinese television actresses